Gregg Wattenberg is a Grammy Award nominated songwriter, music producer, and musician residing in New York City, New York.

Work
Gregg Wattenberg has co-written and/or co-produced eight No. 1 hit songs that reached the top of Billboard Hot AC, Adult Contemporary, Alternative Radio, and/or Rock charts.

Wattenberg co-wrote and co-produced John Legend’s “Conversations in the Dark” which was RIAA certified Gold  and the 1st lead single from the Bigger Love album which won the 63rd Annual Grammy Award for Best R&B album in 2021.

Wattenberg co-wrote and produced The Unlikely Candidates’ No. 1 hit single “Novocaine” which reached the top spot on the Billboard Alternative Radio chart in 2020.

Wattenberg co-wrote and produced Phillip Phillips' No. 1 hit and RIAA Certified Platinum single "Gone, Gone, Gone" on the Platinum album The World From The Side Of The Moon.

Wattenberg co-produced Train's No. 1 hit  and RIAA Multi-Platinum single "Hey, Soul Sister" which was certified with a RIAA Diamond Award (10× Platinum) in 2021. Only 57 songs have been awarded RIAA Diamond certification in music history as of July 15, 2021.

Wattenberg also co-wrote and co-produced Train's No. 1 hit and RIAA Certified Platinum single "If It's Love".

Wattenberg co-wrote the Daughtry No. 1 hit  and RIAA 2x Multi-Platinum single "It's Not Over” which was the lead single for the 6x Multi-Platinum album Daughtry.

Gregg Wattenberg co-wrote O.A.R.'s No. 1 song  and RIAA Certified Platinum hit "Shattered (Turn the Car Around).” 

Wattenberg also co-wrote Goo Goo Dolls Top 10 Adult Contemporary Single "Let Love In" from the RIAA Certified Gold album Let Love In.

Wattenberg produced Five for Fighting's No. 1 hit singles "Superman (It's Not Easy)" and "100 Years" and co-wrote and produced Top 5 AC single "Slice".

Production discography

References

Year of birth missing (living people)
Living people
Record producers from New York (state)
Musicians from New York (state)